Xyroptila oenophanes is a moth of the family Pterophoridae. It is found in India and Taiwan.

References

Moths described in 1908
oenophanes
Moths of Asia
Moths of Japan